The 2011 FIVB Women's Club World Championship was the fifth edition of the event. It was held in Doha, Qatar from October 8 to 14, 2011.

Qualification

Pools composition

Squads

Venue

Pool standing procedure
Match won 3–0 or 3–1: 3 points for the winner, 0 points for the loser
Match won 3–2: 2 points for the winner, 1 point for the loser
In case of tie, the teams will be classified according to the following criteria:
number of matches won, sets ratio and points ratio

Preliminary round
All times are Arabia Standard Time (UTC+3).

Pool A

|}

|}

Pool B

|}

|}

Final round
All times are Arabia Standard Time (UTC+3).

Bracket

Semifinals

|}

3rd place

|}

Final

|}

Final standing

Awards
MVP:  Nataša Osmokrović (Rabita Baku)
Best Scorer:  Nataša Osmokrović (Rabita Baku)
Best Spiker:  Nataša Osmokrović (Rabita Baku)
Best Blocker:  Adenízia da Silva (Sollys Nestlé Osasco)
Best Server:  Bahar Toksoy (VakıfBank Ttelekom Istanbul)
Best Setter:  Iryna Zhukova (Rabita Baku)
Best Receiver:  Nataša Osmokrović (Rabita Baku)
Best Libero:  Gizem Güreşen (VakıfBank Ttelekom Istanbul)

References

External links
Official Website of the 2011 FIVB Women's Club World Championship

2011 FIVB Women's Club World Championship
FIVB Women's Club World Championship
FIVB Women's Club World Championship
FIVB Volleyball Women's Club World Championship
Sports competitions in Doha